Lunenburg County can refer to:
Lunenburg County, Nova Scotia, Canada
Lunenburg County, Virginia, United States